Assas may refer to
 Assas, Hérault, commune in France
 University of Paris II Panthéon-Assas, commonly called "Panthéon-Assas" or "Assas"
 Assa (disambiguation) various senses, some of which may be pluralised by adding -s

See also
 Nicolas-Louis d'Assas (1733–1760), Chevalier d'Assas, a captain of the French Régiment d'Auvergne; after whom is named
 Rue d'Assas, street Paris, France
 Otmane El Assas (born 1979) Moroccan footballer